Shabazz Ford (born February 17, 1980), known by his stage name Fatt Father, is an American rapper from Detroit, Michigan. He is a one fourth part of the Fat Killahz (with Marv Won, Bang Belushi and King Gordy) and one half of Twin Towers (with Marv Won).

Early life
Shabazz grew up in Detroit with his mother and two brothers, Sammie and Jerry. The oldest, Shabazz was forced at a young age to become the leading male role model he and his brothers never really had. Shabazz found himself with many different roles in the household, which he was not comfortable with at first. He said, "I grew up and I found my niche, which was music". Studying at Denby High School, music was his way to escape his home problems. He said, "Without that, I would have been out on the streets hustling, and doing what I needed to do in order to survive".

Career

Fatt Father made his appearance on the Teamstaz debut album Don't Cross The Line (2000, No Tyze Entertainment).

Widely recognized as a core-member of the Detroit hip hop collective Fat Killahz (formed in 2001), Fatt Father has built a strong fan base via his work with the group, coupled with his own mixtapes and street projects ranging from the classic Tales of the Childless Father to Father's Day on to You Are The Father and Fatherly Advice; all of which garnered Fatt Father a lot of support and praise within the underground hip hop community.

Guess Who's Coming To Dinner?, Fat Killahz debut album, allowed Fatt Father and his group to share the stage with hip hop icons like Ice Cube, 50 Cent, Method Man & Redman as well as Detroit's Royce Da 5'9", Danny Brown, Slum Village, D12 and Trick-Trick.

His debut self-titled album, executive produced by himself and Trick-Trick, enabled Fatt Father to be recognized even without his friends. Over the years he released music such as My Kids Need A Coat which not only showcased his lyrical skill but also shined a light on his loyalty to his children. It was his sophomore album, Fatherhood, that solidified his place as a hip hop heavy-weight.

Fatt Father has also collaborated on records with rappers such as Kuniva, Denmark Vessey, Guilty Simpson, Sean Price, Black Milk, Roc Marciano, Elzhi, and more. Fatts stated Scarface, Notorious B.I.G., Royce Da 5'9", The Temptations and the Fat Killahz as his biggest influence.

Personal life
Shabazz Ford is married and has two children. In 2003, Shabazz’s younger brother Sam was killed at the age of 19, he died on their mother's birthday in 2003. He was a friend of now deceased rappers Chris Cobb and Proof.

In 2014, he started a cartoon project "Storytime With Fattfather" with graphics by Auxiliary Cinema, but only one episode has been released.

In addition to his rap career, Shabazz Ford is a real estate investor and CEO of Fueled By Life Media Group and co-founder of Early Ventures LLC along with his younger brother Jerry Ford.

Discography

Studio albums
 2008 - Fatt Father
 2012 - Fatherhood
 2016 - Veterans Day
2020 - King Father
2021 - Soccer Dad

Street albums
 2010 - Fatherly Advice (The Legend of James Evans Sr.)

Mixtapes
 2006 - Tales of the Childless Father
 2008 - You are the Father
 2008 - Christmas With Fatt Father

Non-album songs
 2007 - Father's Day
 2008 - Letter To Barack Obama
 2009 - B.U.M.S. (Being Underground Makes Sense)
 2010 - The Corner
 2015 - My Kids Need A Coat
 2016 - They Know
 2016 - Daddy Dearest
 2016 - Slow Down

Guest appearances

References

External links

Living people
Underground rappers
Rappers from Detroit
American male rappers
Midwest hip hop musicians
1980 births
21st-century American rappers
21st-century American male musicians